Hmar may refer to:

Hmars or Hmar people, in northeastern India
Hmar languages, Tibeto-Burman subfamily of languages, spoken by the Hmar
Hmar language, the main Tibeto-Burman language of the Hmar

Language and nationality disambiguation pages